Lela Keburia (birth 21 September 1976, Zugdidi, Georgian SSR, USSR) is a Georgian politician and philologist. Member of Parliament of Georgia since 2016. She was born on 21 September 1976 in Zugdidi. In 1997 she graduated from Tbilisi State University, Faculty of Philology. 1998–2012 was Teacher of Georgian Language and Literature at No.2 Zugdidi Public School. In 2012 she was acting Head of Zugdidi Educational Resource Center. Since 2013 – she is a senior teacher at No.2 Zugdidi Public School. Since 2016 she has been a member of parliament of Georgia. After 2017 she is a member of European Georgia.

References

1976 births
Living people
Members of the Parliament of Georgia
United National Movement (Georgia) politicians
21st-century politicians from Georgia (country)
Tbilisi State University alumni